The 1960 All-Atlantic Coast Conference football team consists of American football players chosen by various selectors for their All-Atlantic Coast Conference ("ACC") teams for the 1960 NCAA University Division football season. Selectors in 1960 included the Associated Press (AP) and the United Press International (UPI).

All-Atlantic Coast selections

Ends
 Gary Barnes, Clemson (UPI-1)
 Claude "Tee" Moorman, Duke (UPI-1)
 Gary Collins, Maryland (UPI-1)

Tackles
 Dwight Bumgarner, Duke (UPI-1)
 Ronnie Osborne, Clemson (UPI-1)

Guards
 Alex Gilleskie, North Carolina State (UPI-1)
 Jake Bodkin, South Carolina (UPI-1)

Centers
 Rip Hawkins, North Carolina (UPI-1)

Backs
 Roman Gabriel, North Carolina State (UPI-1 [quarterback])
 Norm Snead, Wake Forest (UPI-1 [quarterback])
 Claude Gibson, North Carolina State (UPI-1 [halfback])
 Fred Shepherd, Virginia (UPI-1 [fullback])
 Joel Arrington, Duke (UPI-2)

Key
AP = Associated Press

UPI = United Press International

See also
1960 College Football All-America Team

References

All-Atlantic Coast Conference football team
All-Atlantic Coast Conference football teams